Vanishing Girls is a young adult mystery novel by Lauren Oliver, published March 10, 2015 by HarperCollins.

Reception 
Vanishing Girls received a starred review from Publishers Weekly, positive reviews from School Library Journal, Common Sense Media, MTV, and Booklist, and a mediocre review from Kirkus. 

The book also received the following accolades:

 YALSA's Popular Paperbacks for Young Adults Top Ten (2017)
 Publishers Weekly Picks

References 

2015 American novels
Novels set in Virginia
HarperCollins books

See also